Wila Lluxita (Aymara wila blood, blood-red, lluxi shell of a mussel; landslide, -ta a suffix, also spelled Wila Luxita, Wila Llojeta, Huilallojeta) is a  mountain in the Andes. It is situated at the end of the Janq'u Quta valley between Janq'u Laya and Janq'u Uyu in the west and Mullu Apachita in the southeast, all of them higher than 5,000 m.

See also
 Jisk'a Pata
 Phaq'u Kiwuta
 Q'ara Quta
 Warawarani
 Wila Lluxi
 List of mountains in the Andes

References 

Mountains of La Paz Department (Bolivia)